Mateus Viveiros Andrade (born 17 January 1998) is a Brazilian football right side defender.

Club career
Born in Brasilia, Viveiros started playing futsal when he was 6. When he was 11 he started playing football at São Paulo from Brasilia, but shortly after he moved to a more prestigious Brasilia Football Academy. It was playing in the academy that he earned a chance for trials at São Paulo FC and was successful at first. In 2013 he became Brazilian U15 champion with São Paulo. With youth teams of São Paulo he also won the Copa Ouro in 2016 and became Campeonato Paulista champion in U17 and U20 levels.

On February 13, 2017, Viveiros signed a two and a half-year contract with Serbian club Red Star Belgrade. After spending half a year training with senior squad and playing with youth team of Red Star, in summer 2017 he was loaned to FK Bežanija. He made 7 appearances with Bežanija in the 2017–18 Serbian First League.

International career
In January 2014 Viveiros was called to the Brazilian U17 national team, having been called since then regularly such was in March, or May 2015.

In June 2016 he was called for the Brazilian U19 national team. Later that same month he was called to the Brazilian U20 national team.

References

1998 births
Living people
Footballers from São Paulo
Brazilian footballers
Brazilian expatriate footballers
Association football defenders
São Paulo FC players
Red Star Belgrade footballers
FK Bežanija players
Serbian First League players
Expatriate footballers in Serbia